Nashua-Plainfield Community School District (N-P) is a rural, public school district headquartered in Nashua, Iowa.  The district, serving Nashua and Plainfield, occupies sections of four counties: Bremer, Butler, Chickasaw, and Floyd.

It was established on July 1, 1997, by the merger of the Nashua and Plainfield school districts.

Facility
It has a  athletic facility known as the Husky Wellness Center, which opened in 2013.

Circa 2019, there were plans to build a playground with $25,000 raised by students. The district issued a call for volunteers to build it.

Enrollment
In the 2012–2013 school year, the district had 658 students. All except 15 (2.3%) students were non-Hispanic origins. There were two Hispanic students, making up .3% of the total student body. 126 students were eligible for free lunches and 90 students were eligible for reduced priced lunches, both indicators of poverty; combined these students made up 32.8% of the student body. No students were English language learners.  By 2002, enrollment had dropped to 600.

Schools
The district operates two schools, both in Nashua:
 Nashua-Plainfield Elementary School
 Nashua-Plainfield Junior-Senior High School

See also
List of school districts in Iowa
List of high schools in Iowa

References

External links
 Nashua-Plainfield Community School District

School districts in Iowa
Education in Bremer County, Iowa
Education in Butler County, Iowa
Education in Chickasaw County, Iowa
Education in Floyd County, Iowa
1997 establishments in Iowa
School districts established in 1997